Dopff au Moulin is a family winery from 1574 growing grapes on over 70 hectares located in Riquewihr, France.

The main product is Crémant d'Alsace, a special sparkling wine of the Alsace wine region in France.

See also 
List of oldest companies

References

External links 
Homepage

Wineries of France
Companies established in the 16th century
16th-century establishments in France